The Widener Handicap at Hialeah Park Race Track in Hialeah, Florida was a Grade III stakes race for Thoroughbred racehorses 3-years-old and up. It was run over a distance of  miles (10 furlongs) until 1993 when it was modified to  miles. Initially called the Widener Challenge Cup Handicap, the race was named for Hialeah Park owner Joseph E. Widener. It was first run in 1936 as the East Coast counterpart to the Santa Anita Handicap in California.

The magnificence of the Hialeah Park facilities drew the rich and famous to the track and a purse of $50,000 quickly made the Widener Handicap one of the major events of the winter racing season, drawing many of the country's top  horses. The March 16, 1942 issue of TIME magazine said: "nearly every glamor horse in the U.S. was entered in Florida's Widener Handicap, richest race of the winter season."

In 1973 the Thoroughbred Owners and Breeders Association began the grading of races and the Widener Handicap was given Grade I status, the highest designation. The Widener Handicap was a Grade 1 race in 1989 when financial difficulties saw racing at Hialeah Park suspended. On resumption in 1992, the race lost its graded stakes status but earned back a Grade III ranking in 1994 and remained at that until its final running in 2001.

In 2000, the Widener Handicap was run at Gulfstream Park then returned to Hialeah Park in 2001. At the end of that year, financial difficulties spelled the demise of Hialeah Park and with it the Widener Handicap.

When Mary Russ won the 1982 Widener Handicap it marked the first time in the history of North American Thoroughbred racing that a female jockey won a Grade I event.

Three horses won the Widener twice and all were owned by Calumet Farm who won this race eight times, more than any other owner.

Record holders
Speed record:
 At  miles: 1:45.52 – Albert the Great (2001)
 At  miles: 1:58.60 – Turkoman (1986)

Most wins:
 2 – Armed (1946,1947)
 2 – Bardstown (1957,1959)
 2 – Yorky (1961, 1962)

Most wins by a jockey:
 4 – Pat Day (1996, 1997, 1998, 1999)

Most wins by a trainer:
 5 – Horace A. Jones (1949, 1957, 1959, 1961, 1962)

Most wins by an owner:
 8 – Calumet Farm (1939, 1946, 1947, 1949, 1957, 1959, 1961, 1962)

Winners of the Widener Handicap 

 † In 2000 Lemon Drop Kid finished 1st  but was disqualified to 4th for interference.

References

Graded stakes races in the United States
Discontinued horse races in the United States
Horse races in Florida
Hialeah Park
Widener family
Recurring sporting events established in 1936
Recurring sporting events disestablished in 2001
1936 establishments in Florida
2001 disestablishments in Florida